Muinane is an indigenous American language spoken in Colombia.

Classification
Muinane belongs to the Boran language family, along with Bora.

Geographic distribution
Muinane is spoken by 150 people in Colombia along the Upper Cahuinarí river in the Department of Amazonas.  There may be some speakers in Peru.

Phonology

Consonants

 Voiceless stops and affricates contrast with their geminate counterparts:    .

Vowels

Tone
There are two tones in Muinane: high and low.

Grammar
Word order in Muinane is generally SOV.  Case marking is nominative–accusative.

Writing System
Muinane is written using a Latin alphabet.  A chart of symbols with the sounds they represent is as follows:

Palatalized consonants are written using the unpalatalized forms plus y: ty , dy , ry .  For the purposes of alphabetization, these are considered sequences of letters.
Tone is not generally indicated in writing.  When it is shown, it is indicated by an acute accent over the vowel: á, é, í, ɨ́, ó, ú.
The Muinane writing system is based on Spanish orthography.  For that reason, the sound  is written as c before a, ɨ, o, and u and as qu before e and i.  Likewise, the sound  is written as gu before e and i, and g elsewhere.

References

Sources

Boran languages
Languages of Colombia